Adice is an urban neighborhood belonging to the city of Novi Sad, Serbia.

Borders

The southern border of Adice is Podunavska ulica (Podunavska Street), the eastern border is Šumska ulica (Šumska Street), the northern border is Novosadski put (Novi Sad Road), and the western border is a western city limit of Novi Sad.

Neighbouring city quarters
The neighbouring city quarters and settlements are: Telep in the east, Veternička Rampa in the north, Veternik in the west, and Kamenjar in the south.

Population
Population of the Adice neighborhood is ethnically diverse and includes Serbs, a sizable Romani community, as well as members of other ethnic groups.

Features
There is a hotel named "Adice" in the main street of the settlement.

A festival, called "Danube nights of Adice" is held annually in September.

See also
 Neighborhoods of Novi Sad

References

Jovan Mirosavljević, Brevijar ulica Novog Sada 1745-2001, Novi Sad, 2002.
Milorad Grujić, Vodič kroz Novi Sad i okolinu, Novi Sad, 2004.

External links 

Neighborhoods of Novi Sad
About Roma people in Adice (in Serbian)
Detailed map of Novi Sad and Adice
Danube nights web site, annual Adice festival

Novi Sad neighborhoods